The great blue skimmer (Libellula vibrans) is a dragonfly of the skimmer family.
With a total length of 50 to 63 mm, it is one of the largest skimmers. The immature forms of the skimmer are brown in color and mature forms are blue-hued.
This species is found near lakes, ponds, and slow streams in the eastern United States and rarely in southern Ontario.

References

External links 

 Libellula vibrans on BugGuide.Net

Libellulidae
Odonata of South America
Insects of the United States
Insects of Canada
Insects described in 1793